A mango pickle is a variety of pickle prepared using mango. It is very popular in South and Southeast Asia. These sour/spicy pickles are also available commercially.

Varieties

The pickling process in India differs from other regions mainly due to an additional spice mixture added to them after anaerobic fermentation. Pickles are main side dishes and many varieties of vegetables are used. However, raw mango or tender mango is the most popular variety of fruit used for pickling. There are multiple varieties of mango pickles prepared depending on the region and the spices used but broadly there are two types: whole baby mango pickles and cut mango pickle. Whole baby mango pickle is a traditional variety very popular in Southern India and uses baby mangoes that are few weeks old. There are special varieties of mangoes specifically used just for pickling and they are never consumed as ripe fruit. Baby mangoes are pickled using salt, vegetable oil and a blend of hot spices, in a very careful process which ensures pickles are preserved for years.

Cut mango pickle

This is ideally prepared using a special variety of mango that can stay crisp for longer periods when pickled. This variety of mango is specially bred and grafted for use. However, most raw mango varieties  can be pickled if quality is not a concern.

Avakaya
One of the most popular kind of mango pickles is called the "Avakaya", also known as "Urakaya" and it is known for its spice and flavor. It is usually eaten with plain white rice or on the side with other flavored rice items like a hot sauce and is a staple of meals in southern India, especially in the state of Andhra Pradesh.

Avakaya (also known as mango pickle) is a variety of Indian pickle popular in South India with its origin in Delta Districts of Andhra Pradesh. The main ingredients are mangoes,  (powdered mustard seeds) and a combination of other spices used for pickling. South Indians are known to have a deep attachment to these spicy pickles. A wide variety of pickles are available in these regions, using mango as their prime ingredient. Besides being made at home, the pickles are available commercially and are exported to the United States, Europe, Japan and many other countries.

Avakaya pickles are usually made in the summer, this being the time for peak availability of green mangoes. Green mangoes, hot oil, chilies and a variety of spices are the key ingredients. The process of preparation, storage and serving is considered almost a ritual.

The mangoes are cut into medium-sized pieces approximately 2 cm x 2 cm using strong and especially sharp cutters/knives in swift strokes so as not to structurally damage the pieces. These pieces are wiped clean and dry with a highly-absorbent soft cloth — usually an old sterilized cotton sari with no embroidery, stowed away for this purpose. They are then pickled with powdered mustard, red chili powder (dried and powdered or sometimes dried, roasted and powdered), salt, gingelly oil. The mixture matures for four to eight weeks, care being taken to mix the contents periodically to ensure a uniform marinade.

Hot rice is mixed with one or two pieces of avakaya and ghee (clarified butter) or groundnut oil, then made into bite-size balls. Avakaya is often eaten with rice and dahi (yogurt). Raw onion can be added  which enhances the taste. Some people prefer to eat it within 1–2 months from preparation, when it is called .

Pickled mango chutney

This is a variation where mangoes are grated to produce a chutney-like pickle.

Kadumango

This is a variation of mango pickle. This kind of pickle is made from tender mango. The small mangoes are collected when the mangoes just start to grow. In this pickle the mango is not cut into pieces; the whole mango is prepared as a form of pickle.

See also

References

External links

Indian condiments
Indian pickles
Pickle
Pickles
Pakistani pickles
Bangladeshi condiments